Bette Joy Philbin (née Senese; born February 1, 1941) is an American television personality, and the widow of television personality Regis Philbin.

Career
In the late 1960s, Senese worked as an assistant to comedian and talk show host Joey Bishop. Regis Philbin was Bishop's on-air sidekick.
Many years later, after raising children, Philbin hosted HGTV's At Home With... and the syndicated home show, Haven.  She occasionally co-hosted with her husband on his show, Live with Regis and Kathie Lee (1988–2001), and she also occasionally co-hosted with him on Live with Regis and Kelly  in Kelly Ripa's absence, until he retired. She also guest-starred with her husband on Ripa's situation-comedy television series Hope & Faith (2003–2006).

Personal life

Joy and Regis Philbin were married on March 1, 1970, and together the couple had two daughters, Joanna and J. J.

In August 2007, Regis and Joy Philbin announced that their daughter J. J. and her husband, television producer Michael Schur, were expecting their first child in 2008, a boy named William Xavier Schur.  He was nicknamed "Mr. Trouble" by Regis, and was often referred to as such on Live. In 2010, J. J. gave birth to another child, a girl named Ivy Elizabeth Schur.

The couple split their time between their apartment in New York City and condo in Beverly Hills, California.

Regis Philbin died on July 25, 2020. The couple had been married for fifty years.

References

External links

 

1941 births
Living people
American women television personalities
Television personalities from New York City